The 180th Pennsylvania House of Representatives District is located in Philadelphia and has been represented since 2023 by Jose Giral.

District profile
The 180th Pennsylvania House of Representatives District is located in Philadelphia County and encompasses the Franklin Institute and the Philadelphia Zoo. It also includes the following areas:

 Ward 07
 Ward 33
 Ward 42 [PART, Divisions 01 and 23]
 Ward 45 [PART, Divisions 08, 09, 10, 11, 13, 14, 16, 17, 19 and 21]

Representatives

Recent election results

References

External links
District map from the United States Census Bureau
Pennsylvania House Legislative District Maps from the Pennsylvania Redistricting Commission.  
Population Data for District 180 from the Pennsylvania Redistricting Commission.

Government of Philadelphia
180